The 2011 Novak Djokovic tennis season is widely regarded as one of the greatest seasons ever in men's tennis. He ended the year with an impressive 10–1 record against Rafael Nadal and Roger Federer, the other two best players of the year. From the start of the year, he went undefeated until the French Open semifinals in June (losing to Federer), compiling a 41-match winning streak. Djokovic won ten tournaments, three of them Grand Slam events: the Australian Open, Wimbledon Championships and the US Open. He won a then record (since broken by himself) five Masters Series 1000 titles: Indian Wells, Miami and Canada, played on hard courts, and Madrid and Rome, on clay. Djokovic also won in Dubai and at the Serbia Open. 

Djokovic won seventy matches and lost only six (including two in which he retired due to injury). He beat Nadal in six finals during the season and reached the world No. 1 ranking for the first time on 4 July, maintaining the top ranking for the rest of the season. Among the six finals he defeated Nadal, two were in Masters tournaments on clay: a notable reversal due to the fact that he had lost all nine matches played against Nadal on clay prior to this season. He also set a new season record by winning $12.6 million USD in prize money on the ATP World Tour. Furthermore, he obtained a 21-4 record against top-10 and a 13-3 against Top-5 players.

Year summary

Early Hardcourt events

Australian Open

In the last week of January, Djokovic took on the four-time and reigning champion Roger Federer. The first set was won in a tiebreaker, which went to Djokovic in seven-points-to-three. In the second set, Djokovic took an early break of serve, when Federer overhit his backhand shot. But Djokovic let Federer gain control and Federer broke twice to take a four-games-to-two lead. In a pivotal ninth game, Federer was serving for the set, but hit an ineffective drop shot that allowed Djokovic back into the set. In the eleventh game, Federer again lost serve, paving the way for Djokovic to go up two-sets-to-none. Federer broke Djokovic in the eight game of the third set to level it at four-games all, but Djokovic broke again in the ninth game. This allowed Djokovic to serve out the match.

In the final, Djokovic took on Andy Murray, with Murray coming under serious duress in the second game, when he had to survive a 14-minute service game. Murray held serve at this key juncture, and the first set stayed on serve until the tenth game. During that crucial game, they were embroiled in a 39-shot tussle, which gave the relieved Serb a break point. Djokovic took the break of serve on the subsequent point, and captured the first set in a hard-fought 59 minutes. Djokovic quickly overcame the Briton in the second set to take a five-games-to-none advantage, which allowed him to take the set, only losing two games. Djokovic went on to win the third set, which allowed him to capture his second Australian Open title.

Dubai

In February in the Dubai final, Federer was unable to hold serve in the third game, allowing Djokovic to get the upper hand in the first set. In the second set Federer was first to break, but he could not hold on to the advantage. Djokovic won the match.

Indian Wells Masters

In the first half of March Djokovic met Federer in the semifinals of Indian Wells, and they split the opening two sets of the match. Djokovic quickly broke Federer's service in the third set, but had to stave off two break points on his own serve to go up two-games-to-love. The players traded breaks until Djokovic won the final four games to take the set and match. With this win Djokovic moved up to Number 2 in the ATP World Tour Rankings.

Djokovic played Rafael Nadal in the final, for their first encounter of the season.  The first set went to Nadal via two breaks of Djokovic's serve. In the second set, Djokovic was up five-games-to-three, and faced five deuces before taking the set. In the third set Djokovic took command and lost only two games to take victory.

Miami Masters

In the second half of March Djokovic met Nadal for the second time of the season in the finals yet again. Nadal quickly took a three-games-to-one advantage, and saved breakpoints to advance to five-games-to-one. Djokovic recovered a break but couldn't avoid losing the set. Djokovic started well in the second set, going up four-games-to-love. Djokovic won the second set to force a deciding third set. The final set was decided in a tiebreak. Djokovic got down early in the tiebreak, but recovered to win the match.

Clay court events

Serbia Open

In April in his hometown tournament Djokovic met Spaniard Feliciano López in the final of the Serbia Open in Belgrade. The first set went to a tiebreaker, which was won by Djokovic. Djokovic went on to the victory in the match, only losing two games in the second set.

Madrid Masters

In May in the final of the Madrid Masters, Djokovic took a four-games-to-love lead over Rafael Nadal, but Nadal came back to five-games-all. Djokovic was able to break again and took the opening set. Djokovic got broken in the opening service game of the second set, but came back to win the set and the match.

Rome Masters

Djokovic met Andy Murray in the semifinals of the Rome Masters. Djokovic went to a one set lead. Murray took the second set with just one break of serve in the sixth game of the set. In the third set, Murray was serving for the match at five-games-to-four, but Djokovic broke back. The match was decided in a tiebreak, with Djokovic winning it.

Djokovic played Nadal in the finals. Djokovic failed to serve for the set after getting a break in the eight game, but took the set after getting another break.  The second set was very close, with Djokovic converting his fourth match point to win the title, his second Masters title on clay courts this year.

With this victory Djokovic was the first player to qualify for the 2011 ATP World Tour Finals.

French Open

Djokovic met Roger Federer in the semifinals. It was the first time the two rivals met at Roland Garros. Federer went into the match with a 13–9 lead in their head-to-head matchup as well as a 2–1 lead in their head-to-head on clay. The first set featured an exchange of breaks, with Federer taking the tiebreak when Djokovic hit a forehand into the net at 5–6. In the second set Federer capitalized on an early break to take a two sets lead. Djokovic came back by winning the third set. The fourth set was close with both players holding serve through the first eight games. In the ninth game Djokovic finally managed to break and prepared to serve to level the match. Federer broke back. Djokovic had another break opportunity in the eleventh service game, but the set went into a tiebreak. Roger Federer finally sealed the match with an ace on his first match point. The loss marked Djokovic's first defeat of the season (with Federer also being the last man to defeat Djokovic in 2010), ending a 43-match win streak and his chance to win the Calendar Year Grand Slam.

Grass court events

Wimbledon Championships

In June Djokovic took on Frenchman Jo-Wilfried Tsonga in the semifinals of Wimbledon. The match started out in an inauspicious way for Djokovic, as he was broken in his opening service game. Djokovic broke back in tenth game, and went on to win the first set in a tiebreak. Djokovic also took the second set. The third set was an up-and-down affair with several breaks of serve, but also ended in a tiebreak. Tsonga took this third set. Next Djokovic won the fourth set and the match. This win allowed Djokovic to take over the World Number 1 ranking from Rafael Nadal.

Djokovic met Nadal for their first meeting in a Wimbledon final. Djokovic took the first set with his first break in the match. The second and third sets were quite lopsided affairs. Djokovic took the second set, but Nadal hit back in the third set. At four-games-to-three in the fourth set, Djokovic managed to get the needed break of serve. Next he served out the match to take his first Wimbledon title.

US Open Series events

Canada Masters

In the August US Open Series Djokovic played Mardy Fish in the final of the Canada Masters. Djokovic got off to a good start by winning the first set while losing only two games. In the fifth game of the second set, Djokovic lost his serve to Fish, who went on to take the set. In the third set, Djokovic was serving for the match at five-games-to-three, and took the match on his fourth match point. This was Djokovic's fifth Masters Series victory for the season, a record.

Cincinnati Masters

Djokovic faced Andy Murray in the finals. The match stayed on serve until the seventh game, when Murray got a break, allowing him to take the opening set. After Murray won the first three games in the second set, Djokovic retired from the match with a shoulder injury.

US Open

Djokovic met Federer in the US Open for the fifth year in a row, this time in the semi-finals. Federer took the first two sets, and Djokovic won the next two sets. In the decisive fifth set, Djokovic dropped his serve in the eighth game, allowing Federer to serve for the match. Federer got two match points, but Djokovic was able to save them and break back. With another break of serve Djokovic won the match and reached his third Major final of the season.

Djokovic played Nadal in the final, their second successive Major final, and their sixth encounter in a final for the season. The first two sets saw Nadal taking two-games-to-love leads. But on both occasions Djokovic recovered to take a two sets lead. Djokovic was serving for the match in the twelfth game of the third set, but was broken by Nadal. Nadal took that set in a tiebreak. Despite receiving treatment early in the fourth set, Djokovic went on to win the match in four sets, taking his first US Open title.

Late Hardcourt events
In October at the 2011 Swiss Indoors, Djokovic lost in the semifinals to Kei Nishikori, for only his fourth loss of the season.

In November during the Paris Masters, Djokovic withdrew against Jo-Wilfried Tsonga in the quarterfinals.

ATP World Tour Finals
Djokovic qualified for the ATP World Tour Finals for the fifth consecutive year. Novak was drawn into group A alongside Tomáš Berdych, David Ferrer and Andy Murray. He beat Berdych, lost to Ferrer in straights and then lost to replacement player Janko Tipsarević, who substituted Murray. With a 1–2 record in the round-robin stage he was eliminated from the tournament.

Davis Cup
In September Djokovic missed the first rubber of the Davis Cup tie vs Argentina.  He came back to play Juan Martín del Potro in the fourth rubber, and lost the first set, before withdrawing with injury midway through the second set. Serbia lost the tie.

Hopman Cup
In January Djokovic teamed up with Ana Ivanovic to represent Serbia in the Hopman Cup. They reached the final, but had to withdraw before the match because Ivanovic sustained an injury.

Analysis
Tennis Magazine ranked it the third Greatest tennis season of the Open Era, behind Roger Federer's 2006 and Rod Laver's 1969. Pete Sampras hailed Djokovic's 2011 season as the best he has ever seen in his lifetime, calling it "one of the best achievements in all of sports." Boris Becker called Djokovic's season "one of the very best years in tennis of all time," adding that it "may not be the best statistically, but he's beaten Federer, he's beaten Nadal, he's beaten everybody that came around to challenge him in the biggest tournaments in the world." Rafael Nadal, who lost to Djokovic in six finals on three different surfaces, described Djokovic's performances as "probably the highest level of tennis that I ever saw."

Djokovic's performance improved on all grounds compared to the previous year, especially on his return games, with the efficiency of his second serve return points (overall 58%) leading him to the season best return games won statistics (39%).  Justin Gimelstob attributed Djokovic's consistency to the improvement in his service game, particularly when it came to his second services, which was just one percent behind of those statistic leaders like Nadal and Federer. According to him Djokovic's strength derived from his agility, his backhand and his return of serve, which was the best on the 2011 tour.

All matches
This table lists all the matches of Djokovic this year, including walkovers W/O (they are marked ND for non-decision)

Singles matches

Source

Doubles matches

Source

Hopman Cup matches

Singles

Mixed doubles

Tournament schedule

Singles schedule

NOTE: In 2010 season total year-end points from ABN AMRO Tournament and Aegon Championships were not counted, as well as those from First Round, Quarterfinals and Semifinals of Davis Cup.

Doubles schedule

Yearly records

Head-to-Head matchups
Novak Djokovic has a  record against the top 10,  against the top 50, and ) against other players.

Ordered by number of wins
(Bolded number marks a top 10 player at the time of match, Italic means top 50)

Finals

Singles: 11 (10 titles, 1 runner-up)

Earnings
Novak Djokovic earned a record-breaking $12.6 million throughout the season.
Bold font denotes tournament win

Awards and nominations
 ATP Player of the Year
 ITF World Champion
 BBC Overseas Sports Personality of the Year
 United States Sports Academy Male Athlete of the Year
 AIPS Athletes of the Year
 AIPS Europe Athletes of the Year
 DSL Sport Golden Badge
 Best Sportsman by OCS
 GQ ACE of the Year

See also
2011 ATP World Tour
2011 Roger Federer tennis season
2011 Rafael Nadal tennis season

Notes
 The Australian dollar is converted to US dollar on the quotient of the numbers given in the reference for Row 1 (0.959).
 The Euro is converted to US dollar on the quotient of the numbers given in the references for Row 5,6,7,8,13,14 and the bottom source.
 The points and result comparison is based on the player's 2010 and 2011 singles activity.
 The points and result comparison is based on the player's 2010 and 2011 doubles activity.

References

External links
  
 ATP tour profile

Novak Djokovic tennis seasons
Djokovic
2011 in Serbian sport